
Grodzisk Mazowiecki County is a unit of territorial administration and local government (powiat) in Masovian Voivodeship, east-central Poland. It came into being on 1 January 1999, as a result of the Polish local government reforms passed in 1998.

As of 2019 its total population is 93,570, out of which the population of Grodzisk Mazowiecki is 31,782, that of Milanówek is 16,334, that of Podkowa Leśna is 3,851, and the rural population is 41,603.

Neighbouring counties
Grodzisk Mazowiecki County is bordered by Warsaw West County to the north-east, Pruszków County and Piaseczno County to the east, Grójec County to the south, and Żyrardów County and Sochaczew County to the west.

Administrative division
The county is subdivided into six gminas (two urban, one urban-rural and three rural). These are listed in the following table, in descending order of population.

References

 
Grodzisk Mazowiecki